Jordan Jackson-Hope (born 5 April 1996) is an Australian rugby union player who currently plays as an inside-centre or fly-Half for the  in the international Super Rugby competition. He can also play the fullback position.

Youth career

Born and bred in Canberra, Jackson-Hope attended school at St Edmund's College where his performances as captain of their 1st XV saw him named in both the ACT and Australian Schoolboys sides in 2014.

Senior career

After leaving school, Jackson-Hope joined up with the Tuggeranong Vikings, a local side who compete in the ACTRU Premier Division.   He appeared for both their under-20 and senior sides in 2015 and his form there saw him handed a development contract with Canberra-based Super Rugby franchise, the Brumbies.

He made 2 substitute appearances in total during the campaign and scored 1 try.

International

Jackson-Hope was selected as a member of the Australia under-20 squad which competed in the 2016 World Rugby Under 20 Championship in England where he made 4 appearances and scored 1 try.

Super Rugby statistics

References

1996 births
Living people
Australian rugby union players
Rugby union fly-halves
Rugby union centres
ACT Brumbies players
Sunwolves players
Rugby union players from Canberra
Canberra Vikings players
Toyota Industries Shuttles Aichi players
New Orleans Gold players